Microphalera is a monotypic moth genus of the family Notodontidae. Its only species, Microphalera grisea, is found in Japan and Taiwan. Both the genus and species were first described by Arthur Gardiner Butler in 1885.

The wingspan is 28–43 mm.

Subspecies
Microphalera grisea grisea (Japan)
Microphalera grisea yoshimotoi Kishida, 1984 (Taiwan)

References

Notodontidae
Moths described in 1885
Moths of Japan
Moths of Taiwan
Monotypic moth genera